Ferenc Szamosi (né Sztoics; 15 February 1915 – 14 July 1968) was a Hungarian ice hockey and field hockey player who competed at the 1936 Winter Olympics and at the 1936 Summer Olympics.

In 1936 he was part of the Hungarian ice hockey team which was eliminated in the second round of the Olympic tournament. He played all six matches.

At the 1936 Summer Games he was a member of the Hungarian field hockey team which was eliminated in the group stage of the Olympic tournament. He played two matches as halfback and back.

External links
 
profile

1915 births
1968 deaths
Hungarian ice hockey centres
Hungarian male field hockey players
Olympic ice hockey players of Hungary
Olympic field hockey players of Hungary
Ice hockey players at the 1936 Winter Olympics
Field hockey players at the 1936 Summer Olympics
Sportspeople from Budapest
EHC Arosa players
Újpesti TE (ice hockey) players